Yle Teema & Fem is a Finnish free-to-air television channel owned by Finnish state-broadcaster Yle. It was launched on 24 April 2017, after Yle Teema and Yle Fem merged to this channel.

Teema & Fem is Yle's channel for culture, education, and science. The "Teema" hours focus on recordings of performing arts, classical music, art, and history documentaries, films, and themed programming. The channel also broadcasts Swedish-language news (including yle's Swedish-language evening bulletin TV-nytt), factual and children's programmes and entertainment as part of the "Fem" hours. It also shows many Nordic films and series and Sami-language Ođđasat. Finnish and Swedish subtitles are available for many programmes not originally in those respective languages. Outside prime time, Teema & Fem showed selected programmes acquired from Sveriges Television, Sweden's equivalent of Yle, until May 2017.

References

External links 
Official site for Yle Fem 
Official site for Yle Teema 

Yle television channels
Television channels and stations established in 2017
Finland-Swedish television shows